Orthomecyna albicaudata is a moth of the family Crambidae described by Arthur Gardiner Butler in 1883. It is endemic to the Hawaiian island of Lanai.

External links

Crambinae
Endemic moths of Hawaii